John Thomas Tilman (July 10, 1845 – February 28, 1905) was an American politician who served in the Virginia House of Delegates.

References

External links 

1845 births
1905 deaths
Democratic Party members of the Virginia House of Delegates
19th-century American politicians